Citrinophila marginalis, the narrow-margined yellow, is a butterfly in the family Lycaenidae. It is found in Sierra Leone, Liberia, Ivory Coast, Ghana, Togo, and western Nigeria. Its habitat consists of forests.

References

Butterflies described in 1887
Poritiinae
Taxa named by William Forsell Kirby
Butterflies of Africa